George Washington Blanchard (January 26, 1884October 2, 1964) was a member of the United States House of Representatives from 1933 to 1935. He was a Republican. He represented Wisconsin's 1st congressional district in the 73rd United States Congress. He was elected in the election of 1932 receiving 48.5% of the vote.

Biography
Born in Colby, Wisconsin, Blanchard graduated from the Colby High School and then received his bachelor's and law degrees from the University of Wisconsin. He then practiced law in Edgerton, Wisconsin. He served in the Wisconsin State Assembly in 1925 and the Wisconsin State Senate in 1927. He died in Edgerton on October 2, 1964.

Blanchard's son, David, was Speaker of the Wisconsin State Assembly. David's wife, Carolyn, was also a member of the Assembly.  Another son, George Jr., died by suicide in 1940.

References

External links

1884 births
1964 deaths
People from Colby, Wisconsin
People from Edgerton, Wisconsin
University of Wisconsin–Madison alumni
University of Wisconsin Law School alumni
Republican Party members of the Wisconsin State Assembly
Republican Party Wisconsin state senators
Wisconsin lawyers
Republican Party members of the United States House of Representatives from Wisconsin
20th-century American politicians
20th-century American lawyers